Whitehall Colmcille (Irish: Fionnbhrú Colmcille ) is a Gaelic Athletic Association club based on Collins' Avenue in Dublin 9, Ireland.   The Club has contributed in a big way to the success of various County Football teams and All Ireland titles producing many well known names.

History
Whitehall Gaels took over the lease Thorndale Tennis Club had with Dublin Corporation on Collins Avenue in 1966. Whitehall Gaels merged with Cumann Barra Colmcille in 1973 the objective being of strengthening the Hurling side of the Club, as Colmcille was basically a Hurling Club.    Both clubs had senior officials linked to each other that made the amalgamation a smooth one.  The Club has won Hurling and Football Championships  since then.

The club is still there with a popular members bar (opened 1978), sports hall (built 1986) and ancillary rooms. The club purchased land in Cloghran in 1988 and built dressing rooms on the site in 1997, an all weather training pitch in 2002 and weights room in 2004.

In December 2010 the Club applied to Dublin City Council for planning permission for playing pitch and clubhouse on land opposite the Whitehall cinema on Collins Avenue, Dublin

Achievements
 Dublin Junior Football Championship Winners 1966
 Dublin Junior B Football Championship: Winners 2017
 Dublin Under 21 Football Championship: Winners 1985, 1986, 1987
 Dublin Minor A Football Championship Winners (2) 1984, 2018
 Dublin Senior Football League Division 1 Winners 1993
 Dublin Intermediate Hurling Championship: Winners 1967, 1971 (both as Colmcille)
 Dublin Junior Hurling Championship: Winner 1966 (as Colmcille)
 Dublin Junior D Hurling Championship Winner 2014
 Dublin Junior E Hurling Championship Winner 2008
 Dublin Under 21 B Hurling Championship Winner 2017
 Dublin Minor D Hurling Championship Winners 2008

Notable players
Cormac Costello - 7 Time All Ireland winning Dublin senior footballer
 Eoghan O'Donnell - Dublin senior hurler and club footballer
 Tommy Drumm - Former Dublin All Ireland Winning Football Captain and GAA Texaco Footballer of the Year 1983
 Paul Clarke - Former Dublin All-Ireland Winning Footballer, All-Star Winner and Dublin Assistant Manager 
 Paddy Moran - Former Dublin All-Ireland Winning Footballer 
 Daire Gray - Dublin Senior Hurler
 Lee Gannon - Dublin Senior Footballer

References

External links
Official Club Web-Site
Dublin Club GAA

Gaelic games clubs in Dublin (city)
Gaelic football clubs in Dublin (city)
Hurling clubs in Dublin (city)